The 2009 Women's County One-Day Championship was the 13th cricket Women's County Championship season. It ran from May to September and saw 30 county teams and teams representing Ireland, Scotland, Wales and the Netherlands compete in a series of divisions. Kent Women won the County Championship as winners of the top division, going through the season unbeaten and winning their third title.

Competition format 
Teams played matches within a series of divisions with the winners of the top division being crowned County Champions. Matches were played using a one day format with 50 overs per side.

The championship works on a points system with positions within the divisions being based on the total points. Points were awarded as follows:

Win: 20 points. 
Tie:  15 points. 
Loss: Bonus points.
Abandoned or No Result: 10 points.
Cancelled No Play: 5 points.

Up to four batting and four bowling points were available to the losing side only, or both sides in an incomplete match.

Teams
The 2009 Championship was divided into five divisions: Divisions One to Four with six teams apiece and Division Five with 10 teams split across two regional groups.

Teams in the top four Divisions played each other twice, and teams in Division Five played each other once.

Division One 

Source: ECB Women's County Championship

Division Two 

Source: ECB Women's County Championship

Division Three 

Source: ECB Women's County Championship

Division Four 

Source: ECB Women's County Championship

Division Five

North & East

Source: ECB Women's County Championship

South & West 

Source: ECB Women's County Championship

Play-off

Statistics

Most runs

Source: CricketArchive

Most wickets

Source: CricketArchive

References

 
2009
cricket
cricket
cricket